Pionenta is a genus of moths in the family Geometridae erected by Clifford D. Ferris in 2010.

Species
 Pionenta ochreata (Hulst, 1898)

References
 

Ourapterygini